Jimmie Baker Jr. (born December 25, 1953) is an American former basketball forward who played collegiately for the University of Nevada – Las Vegas and University of Hawaii. He played for Olney High School in Philadelphia.

Baker was selected by the Philadelphia 76ers in the 3rd round (39th pick overall) of the 1975 NBA Draft, and played for the Kentucky Colonels in the American Basketball Association for 5 games during the 1975–76 ABA season.

References

External links

College statistics

1953 births
Living people
American men's basketball players
Basketball players from Philadelphia
Hawaii Rainbow Warriors basketball players
Kentucky Colonels players
Philadelphia 76ers draft picks
Power forwards (basketball)
Small forwards
UNLV Runnin' Rebels basketball players